Melpomene is a genus of ferns in the family Polypodiaceae, subfamily Grammitidoideae, according to the Pteridophyte Phylogeny Group classification of 2016 (PPG I).

It is native to the Neotropical realm in the Americas and Africa.

The genus name of Melpomene is named after Melpomene, the Greek mythology being, the muse of chorus, who eventually became the muse of tragedy.

The genus was circumscribed by Alan Reid Smith and Robbin C. Moran in Novon Vol.2 (Issue 4) on page 426 in 1992.

Species
Melpomene contains around 30, to 49 species. , the Checklist of Ferns and Lycophytes of the World accepted the following species:

Melpomene albicans Lehnert
Melpomene allosuroides (Rosenst.) A.R.Sm. & R.C.Moran
Melpomene anazalea Sundue & Lehnert
Melpomene caput-gorgonis Lehnert
Melpomene deltata (Mickel & Beitel) A.R.Sm. & R.C.Moran
Melpomene erecta (C.V.Morton) A.R.Sm. & R.C.Moran
Melpomene firma (J.Sm.) A.R.Sm. & R.C.Moran
Melpomene flabelliformis (Poir.) A.R.Sm. & R.C.Moran
Melpomene flagellata Lehnert
Melpomene gracilis (Hook.) A.R.Sm.
Melpomene huancabambensis Lehnert
Melpomene jimenezii Lehnert
Melpomene leptostoma (Fée) A.R.Sm. & R.C.Moran
Melpomene melanosticta (Kunze) A.R.Sm. & R.C.Moran
Melpomene michaelis Lehnert
Melpomene moniliformis (Lag. ex Sw.) A.R.Sm. & R.C.Moran
Melpomene occidentalis Lehnert
Melpomene paradoxa Lehnert
Melpomene personata Lehnert
Melpomene peruviana (Desv.). A.R.Sm. & R.C.Moran
Melpomene pilosissima (M.Martens & Galeotti) A.R.Sm. & R.C.Moran
Melpomene pseudonutans (Christ & Rosenst.) A.R.Sm. & R.C.Moran
Melpomene sklenarii Lehnert
Melpomene sodiroi (Christ & Rosenst.) A.R.Sm. & R.C.Moran
Melpomene vernicosa (Copel.) A.R.Sm. & R.C.Moran
Melpomene vulcanica Lehnert
Melpomene wolfii (Hieron.) A.R.Sm. & R.C.Moran
Melpomene xiphopteroides (Liebm.) A.R.Sm. & R.C.Moran
Melpomene youngii (Stolze) B.León & A.R.Sm.
Melpomene zempoaltepetlensis (Mickel & Beitel) A.R.Sm.

References

Polypodiaceae
Ferns of the Americas
Neotropical realm flora
Fern genera